Falling Skies is an American science fiction television series set in a post-apocalyptic era, created by Robert Rodat and executive produced by Steven Spielberg. The series stars Noah Wyle as Tom Mason, a former history professor who becomes the second-in-command of the 2nd Massachusetts Militia Regiment, a group of civilians and fighters fleeing Boston following an alien invasion that devastated the world.

The series, a production of DreamWorks Television—and from 2014 to 2015, being a production from Spielberg's Amblin Television and Warner Bros. Television—was broadcast in the United States on the cable channel TNT, and in Canada on Super Channel (first-run broadcasts) and on Space (second-run broadcasts on a one-year delay). The series premiered on June 19, 2011. On July 18, 2014, TNT renewed the show for a 10-episode fifth and final season, which started on June 28, 2015, and concluded on August 30, 2015.

Series overview 

Falling Skies begins six months after a global invasion by extraterrestrials, where in early days, the invaders neutralized the world's power grid and technology, defeated and largely destroyed all the world's militaries, and killed over 90 percent of the human population by destroying all of the world's major cities and capitals.

The aliens include mechanical attack drones called "mechs"; a species of light brown-skinned six-legged beings known as "Skitters" that appear to control the mechs; and a mysterious species known as the Overlords, or "Espheni", presumably the actual engineers of the invasion and the masters of the Skitters.

The aliens' objectives are not explained until the fourth season. They plan to extract helium-3 from Earth's moon to power their technology and to use humanity as an enslaved frontline army in their war with another alien race. To do this, the aliens round up children between the ages of 8 and 18 and attach a biomechanical mind control harness to their spines. Forcibly removing it generally kills the child, but midway through the first season, a surgical method is developed that allows a harness to be safely removed, leaving in place the "spikes" that connected the harness to the spinal column. Season five reveals through an Espheni communication device, with which Ben can interact by touching it, due to having the spikes, that  a being is superior to the Overlords, known as "the Queen". In the series finale, the Queen explains that the invasion upon which the entire series is based is the result of a prior Espheni attempt to invade Earth, the only habitable planet in this galaxy, thus of immeasurable strategic importance. Her beloved daughter led that invasion, but the Espheni underestimated humanity and the invasion was stopped. The Queen's daughter was killed and eaten, so the Queen swore to wipe out humanity in revenge.

The story follows a group of survivors who band together to fight back. They call themselves the "2nd Mass", an allusion to the historical regiment from the Continental Army. The group is led by retired United States Army Colonel Dan Weaver. Boston University history professor Tom Mason is second-in-command and must put his extensive knowledge of military history into practice while searching for his son Ben.

At the end of the second season, a new alien race known as the Volm are introduced. Led by a Volm nicknamed Cochise by Tom Mason, the Volm are another species whom the Espheni conquered in their galactic expansion, and who want to destroy the Espheni in revenge. While more Volm forces arrive at the end of the third season, an attack on the Volm across the galaxy causes all but Cochise and a small team of Volm to abandon the Earth. Cochise and his soldiers continue to aid humanity in their war with the Espheni despite the lack of support from their superiors, notably Cochise's father.

In season four, a devastating Espheni counterattack relegates humanity to Espheni-controlled ghettos across the planet. Meanwhile, Tom's half-Espheni daughter Alexis continues to grow and develop psychic powers due to her heritage. After the 2nd Mass eventually escapes the ghettos, another attack severely depletes its numbers. Learning of a power core on the Moon that controls all Espheni technology, Tom and Alexis launch an attack on the power core using a captured Espheni spacecraft. Alexis sacrifices herself to destroy the power core and Tom is left lost in space, but the Espheni war machine is left crippled with the loss of their air support and mechanized servants.

In season five, Tom is rescued by the Espheni's ancient enemy, the Dornia, who guide him into finding his inner warrior to defeat the Espheni once and for all. Returned to Earth, Tom rallies humanity into a global resistance that will march on major Espheni bases all over the world. Tom leads the militias in the United States in a march on the Espheni base in Washington, DC. With the help of an Espheni communications device, humanity learns that the Espheni serve a previously unknown queen who comes to planets when victory is assured and the Espheni are moving from invasion to occupation. Indeed, while in Washington, Tom spots signs of the Espheni moving in on Earth. Tracking the queen to the ruins of the Lincoln Memorial, Tom confronts her alone, and she informs him of the true reason for the invasion. Tom manages to infect the Espheni Queen with a Dornia bioweapon, killing her, and spreading the bioweapon throughout the Espheni species. The Espheni are destroyed and the Earth is freed. Months later, humanity is united and makes plans to elect a new leader. When Tom is offered the position, he refuses it.

Cast

Main

Recurring

 Dale Dye as Colonel/General Jim Porter (seasons 1–3)
 Megan Danso as Deni (seasons 3–5)
 Bruce Gray as Uncle Scott (season 1)
 Martin Roach as Mike Thompson (season 1)
 Lynne Deragon as Kate Gordon (season 1)
 Melissa Kramer as Sarah (season 1)
 Steven Weber as Dr. Michael Harris (season 1)
 Dylan Authors as Jimmy Boland (seasons 1–2)
 Daniyah Ysrail as Rick Thompson (seasons 1–2)
 Ryan Robbins as Tector Murphy, one of the Berserkers (season 2–4)
 Luciana Carro as Crazy Lee, one of the Berserkers (seasons 2–3)
 Brad Kelly as Lyle, one of the Berserkers (seasons 2–4)
 Billy Wickman as Boon, one of the Berserkers (season 2)
 Terry O'Quinn as Arthur Manchester (seasons 2–3)
 Matt Frewer as General Bressler (seasons 2–3)
 Laci J. Mailey as Jeanne Weaver (seasons 2–4)
 Brandon Jay McLaren as Jamil Dexter (season 2)
 Gloria Reuben as Marina Peralta (season 3)
 Robert Sean Leonard as Dr. Roger Kadar (seasons 3–4)
 John H. Mayer as Waschak-Cha'ab (seasons 3–5)
 Dakota Daulby as Kent Matthews (season 4)
 Desiree Ross as Mira (season 4)
 Robert Clotworthy as the Monk (season 4)
 Mark Gibbon as Scorch (season 4)
 Mira Sorvino as Sara (seasons 4–5)
 Treva Etienne as Dingaan Botha (season 4–5)
 John DeSantis as Shaq (season 4–5)
 Catalina Sandino Moreno as Isabella (season 5)

Production

Conception
Development officially began in 2009, when TNT announced that it had ordered a pilot for an untitled alien invasion project. Falling Skies was created by Robert Rodat, who is best known for writing the Oscar-winning film Saving Private Ryan, which was directed by Steven Spielberg. Rodat wrote the pilot episode from an idea  co-conceived by Spielberg. Originally, Falling Skies was called Concord, referencing the battles of Lexington and Concord and Tom Mason's former profession as a history professor. Spielberg then came up with the title Falling Skies. "I felt that this was a very interesting postapocalyptic story with a 21st-century [spin on the] spirit of '76. I came up — out of the blue one day — with the name Falling Skies, which is basically what happens to the planet after this invasion. What is unique about this particular series is that the story starts after a successful conquest of the world," he stated.

Spielberg was attracted to the project due to its themes of survival. "I've always been interested in how we survive and how resourceful we are as Americans. How would the survivors feed the children? How do they resupply themselves militarily in order to defend and even take back what they have lost?" he added. Like much of Spielberg's work, such as The Pacific and E.T. the Extra-Terrestrial, Falling Skies''' running theme is family and brotherhood. He explained, "It's a theme I harken back to a lot because it's something I believe in. It's something I have the closest experience with. [Laughs] They say write what you know, and with seven children and three sisters... I tend to always come back to the family as a touchstone for audiences to get into these rather bizarre stories."

While writing the pilot, Rodat dedicated a five-page montage to the alien invasion, but decided not to go through with it as it had been done before in films such as War of the Worlds. "I wrote a few drafts of it and I looked at and say, 'Ay-yay-yay, I've seen this before. There's no emotion to this. It feels like one of those montages,'" he said. Rodat came up with the idea of having the children in the series "harnessed by aliens". "When we were working out the initial stuff, the thing that excited [Spielberg] was the idea that adults are killed if they're a threat, and kids are captured for whatever reason and changed or altered. The harness was a logical outgrowth of that. Then what we'll explore is what the harnessing does to the kid over the course of the show but that also is something that's going to have to unveil itself gradually," he stated. Spielberg previously explored the idea of enslaved children in the 1984 film Indiana Jones and the Temple of Doom.

Series lead Noah Wyle emphasized Spielberg's presence on set by stating, "Anytime he gives an anointment to a project, it steps up the pedigree." He continued, "[His] fingerprints are all over this. He shaped the script, cast the pilot, watched all the dailies, made the editing suggestions, worked on the post and on the aliens and spaceships."<ref name= "Goldberg">{{cite news|url=https://www.hollywoodreporter.com/live-feed/falling-skies-star-noah-wyle-203181|title=Falling Skies' Star Noah Wyle on Steven Spielberg's Crafting of Series|last=Goldberg|first=Lesley|date=June 19, 2011|work=The Hollywood Reporter}}</ref>

Colin Cunningham, who plays outlaw John Pope, said, "You'd show up and think, 'This is not a TV show; this is something else that we're doing," noting that Spielberg was very hands-on for the pilot. "Its scope is massive. Anytime you hear the word Spielberg, you know it's not going to be crap; you know it'll be quality and there will be some money behind it." Mark Verheiden, who was the showrunner for the first season, stated, "It's great to know you have a world-class filmmaker backing up what you're trying to do who is supportive and helping design the great stuff."

Casting 

Casting announcements began in June 2009 when Noah Wyle was announced as the lead. Wyle, who worked with TNT on The Librarian films, was sent scripts for various shows on their network. He said part of the reason he chose the part was to gain credibility from his children. "With the birth of my kids, I started to really look at my career through their eyes more than my own, so that does dictate choice, steering me toward certain things and away from other things," he said.

He also decided to do it as he could relate with his character, stating, "I identified with Tom's devotion to his sons, and admired his sense of social duty." Spielberg wanted Wyle for the role because he knew him from his previous series ER, which Spielberg's company produced. He had wanted Wyle to appear in his 1998 film Saving Private Ryan, but Wyle was unavailable due to scheduling conflicts. Spielberg stated that he was determined to work with him again.

In July 2009, Moon Bloodgood was cast as Anne Glass, Jessy Schram was cast as Karen Nadler, Seychelle Gabriel was cast as Lourdes, and Maxim Knight was cast as Matt Mason. Bloodgood, the female lead, did not have to audition for the role. She received the script and was offered the role. Bloodgood was drawn to the role because of Spielberg and Rodat's involvement. She stated: "Well certainly when you get handed a script and they tell you it's Bob Rodat and Steven Spielberg, you're immediately drawn to it. It's got your attention. I was a little cautious about wanting to do science fiction again. But it was more of a drama story, more of a family story. I liked that and I wanted to work with Spielberg." Bloodgood added that portraying a doctor excited her. "I liked the idea of playing a doctor and deviating from something I had done already," she said.

In August 2009, Drew Roy was cast as Hal Mason, and Peter Shinkoda was cast as Dai. Drew Roy's agent received the script and the pair joked that Roy might get the role. "This one came to me through my agent, just like everything else. We even joked about the fact that it was a Steven Spielberg project. We were like, 'Oh yeah, I might have a chance.' We were just joking." He auditioned four times for the part. "The whole process went on for quite some time, and then towards the end, it was down to me and one other guy, and we were literally waiting for the word from Steven Spielberg 'cause he had to watch the two audition tapes and give the okay. That, in and of itself, had me like, 'Okay, even if I don't get it, that's just cool.' Fortunately, it went my way."

Filming 

The pilot was filmed in 2009 in Oshawa, Ontario, and the rest of the season was shot from July to November of the following year in Hamilton and Toronto.

TNT announced production had begun on the second season on October 24, 2011. Filming took place in Vancouver and at the Riverview Hospital in Coquitlam, British Columbia from October 2011 to March 2012.

Principal photography for the third season commenced on August 22, 2012, and concluded in December.

Production team 
Rodat and Spielberg serve as executive producers on the project. Graham Yost, Justin Falvey, and Darryl Frank are also executive producers. Yost had previously worked with Spielberg on the HBO miniseries The Pacific. Mark Verheiden is a co-executive producer and the series showrunner. Verheiden had worked as a writer and producer on Battlestar Galactica. Greg Beeman is also a co-executive producer. Melinda Hsu Taylor is a supervising producer for the series; she previously worked on Lost. John Ryan is the on-set producer. Remi Aubuchon was hired as the showrunner for the second season in May 2011 before the first-season premiere. Noah Wyle became a producer for the second season.

Distribution

Broadcast 
The series premiered on June 19, 2011, and was broadcast on the cable television channel TNT in the United States. It also premiered internationally in more than 75 countries that same year.

Online promotion 

For the first season, character videos were made available online. The videos explore the main characters of the series.

As part of the promotional campaign, a vehicle, with the TNT logo and called Falling Skies Technical, was released as a free gift in the social networking game Mafia Wars on June 14, 2011. Following the second-season premiere on June 17, 2012, a live after-show titled 2nd Watch hosted by Wil Wheaton premiered. The series airs after encore presentations of Falling Skies on TNT's official site. Wheaton discusses the latest episode with actors and producers of the series.

Blu-ray and DVD releases 
The first season was released on DVD and Blu-ray on June 5, 2012, in North America, on July 2, 2012, in the United Kingdom and on August 29, 2012, in Australia, and on DVD only in South Africa on August 27, 2012. In addition to all the episodes of the first season, extras include an extended version of the pilot episode, audio commentary on the pilot episode, a season-two preview, the 2011 San Diego Comic-Con International panel, deleted scenes, character profiles, international promos, behind-the-scenes featurettes including the "Making of Skitter", "Harness Makeup Tips", and "Director One on One". A collectible trading card was released exclusively to Blu-ray.

Comic books 
In September 2010, Dark Horse Comics, in partnership with DreamWorks Television and TNT, released the first issue in a four-part digital comic online limited series entitled Falling Skies. Written by Paul Tobin with art by Juan Ferreyra, the series details events taking place before the first season of the television show, but after the alien invasion and victory. These issues were later compiled into a single trade paperback volume entitled Falling Skies Volume 1, which was released in June 2011. On June 15, 2011, Dark Horse announced that due to higher-than-anticipated orders, the graphic novel had completely sold out. It remained in publication .

In April 2012, Dark Horse began releasing a second eight-issue limited series entitled Falling Skies: The Battle of Fitchburg, with Paul Tobin returning as writer and Juan Ferreyra returning as series artist. The digital comic was made available through both Dark Horse Comics and TNT via their respective websites. The story takes place chronologically between the first and second seasons of the television show and details a costly engagement occurring between the skitters and the 2nd Massachusetts Militia Regiment when the aliens surround the human forces at Fitchburg, Massachusetts. While not vital to the story of the television series, TNT and Dark Horse have stated that Falling Skies: The Battle of Fitchburg provides insight into the events leading up to the second season, and elaborates on how the characters got to where they are when the new season opens. As a companion to the comic, TNT released an audio series featuring the character John Pope, offering additional insight into the events detailed in the comic series.

Video game 
Falling Skies: The Game was developed by Torus Games and published by Little Orbit as a turn-based tactical video game inspired by XCOM: Enemy Unknown and it was released for the PlayStation 3, Xbox 360, PC, and the Wii U via the Nintendo eShop on September 30, 2014.

The game received mostly poor to negative reviews across all platforms due to slow gameplay, poor balancing in its mechanics, uninspired characters, and a weak story.

Reception

Critical reception 

For the first season, the series had a mostly positive reception. Tim Goodman of The Hollywood Reporter wrote "...the entertainment value and suspense of Falling Skies is paced just right. You get the sense that we'll get those answers eventually. And yet, you want to devour the next episode immediately." Thomas Conner of the Chicago Sun-Times called it "...a trustworthy family drama but with aliens". He continued, "It's 'Jericho' meets 'V', with the good from both and the bad discarded. It'll raise the summer-TV bar significantly." Ken Tucker from Entertainment Weekly gave the series a B+ and wrote that a "gradually developed, but decisive conviction makes Falling Skies an engaging, if derivative, chunk of dystopian sci-fi". He continued, "...Falling Skies rises above any one performance; it's the spectacle of humans versus aliens that draws you in." In the Boston Herald, Mark A. Perigard gave the series a B grade, writing, "Don't look now, but Falling Skies could be a summer obsession." Brian Lowry from Variety gave the series a mixed review, stating that he enjoyed the action sequences, but that "the soapier elements mostly fall flat" and called the series "painfully old-fashioned".

The second season had positive reviews. Some critics praised it as being stronger than the first season. Maureen Ryan of The Huffington Post compared the second season to the first by saying, "Season 2 is a different animal, a much leaner and meaner machine that allows sentiment to be present but unexpressed and depicts a darker world in which innocence is a luxury that no one can truly afford." Chuck Barney declared, "Sunday's explosive two-hour opener boldly delivers on the promise by TNT producers to rev up both the pace and the firepower in Season 2." Screen Rant's Anthony Ocasio lauded the season premiere. "While further episodes will reveal more, the type of character development, intriguing storylines and exciting action that will be contained in Falling Skies season 2, there's no doubt that TNT's hit drama will likely become an epic adventure, spanning many seasons," he said.

Ratings 
The two-hour premiere of Falling Skies was watched by 5.9 million viewers, making it cable television's biggest series launch of the year, with more than 2.6 million adults 18–49 and 3.2 million adults 25–54. The eighth episode was watched by 4.31 million viewers and scored a 1.5 ratings share among adults 18–49 and Falling Skies became TNT's highest-rated series in target demos. The first-season finale had 5.6 million viewers, the highest-rated episode since the series premiere, with 2.5 million viewers in the 18–49 demographic. The first season tied with the FX series American Horror Story as the biggest new cable series of the year among adults 18–49. In the UK, it premiered on nonterrestrial channel FX, with 402,000 viewers.

Awards and nominations

References

External links 
 
 

 
2010s American drama television series
2011 American television series debuts
2015 American television series endings
American action television series
2010s American science fiction television series
English-language television shows
Post-apocalyptic television series
Serial drama television series
Television series about extraterrestrial life
Television series by Amblin Entertainment
Television series by DreamWorks Television
Television series by Studio T
Television shows filmed in Hamilton, Ontario
Television shows filmed in Toronto
Television shows filmed in Vancouver
Television shows set in Massachusetts
TNT (American TV network) original programming
Alien invasions in television